James Odus Mitchell (June 26, 1899 – July 5, 1989) was an American football player and coach.  As a coach, he was successful both at the high school and collegiate levels. In 42 years of coaching, at all levels, he compiled a 289–129–17 record. In his 21 years as a high school coach, he coached at Slaton, Childress, Pampa, and Marshall, compiling a 165–44–8 record. At Marshall he coached Y. A. Tittle.  From 1946 to 1966, Mitchell was the head football coach at North Texas State College, now the University of North Texas, compiling a record of 122–85–9. From 1946 to 1952, the Mean Green enjoyed seven consecutive winning seasons, which is a school record. His teams earned 10 conference championships, and played in three bowl games. In his 1966 season, North Texas went 8–2, which helped earn him National Coach of the Year honors. In 1986, he was inducted into the Texas Sports Hall of Fame.

Mitchell was also a catalyst for the integration of college football in the state of Texas, as he instituted a policy allowing "any African American students who showed interest in the football team to be given a fair chance" while he was the head coach at North Texas. He extended a partial scholarship offer to incoming African-American freshmen Abner Haynes and Leon King in 1956, promoting them to the varsity squad in 1957. Haynes and King both made their varsity debuts on the road against UTEP (then known as Texas Western) on September 21, 1957, becoming the first African-Americans to play major college football in Texas.

In the summer of 1965, he also recruited future National Football League Hall of Famer Mean Joe Greene from all-black Dunbar High School in Temple, Texas. The ferocious Greene-led defense allowed an average of less than two yards per carry in 1966, Mitchell's final season at North Texas, earning the team the nickname "Mean Green," which stuck and is now the official mascot of the university to this day.

Head coaching record

College

References

External links
 UNT - Coach Odus Mitchell
 

1899 births
1989 deaths
North Texas Mean Green football coaches
West Texas A&M Buffaloes football players
High school football coaches in Texas
Sportspeople from Denton, Texas